Patriarch Arsenius may refer to:

 Patriarch Arsenius of Alexandria, Greek Patriarch of Alexandria in 1000–1010
 Patriarch Arsenius I of Constantinople, Ecumenical Patriarch of Constantinople in 1255–1260 and 1261–1267
 Serbian Patriarch Arsenius II, Serbian Patriarch from 1457 to 1463
 Serbian Patriarch Arsenius III, Serbian Patriarch from 1674 to 1690 (1706)
 Serbian Patriarch Arsenius IV, Serbian Patriarch from 1725 to 1737 (1748)

See also
 Arsenius (name)
 Patriarch (disambiguation)
 Patriarch Arsenije (disambiguation)